Pelley is a surname, and may refer to:

Rod Pelley (born 1984), Canadian ice hockey player
Scott Pelley (born 1957), American television journalist
William Dudley Pelley (1890–1965), United States activist and Nazi sympathizer

See also

le Pelley
Pelly (surname)
Pelli, surname